Downriver is the unofficial name for a collection of 18 cities and townships in Wayne County, Michigan, south of Detroit, along the western shore of the Detroit River.

Etymology
The name derives from the fact that the Detroit River, after running more or less west along the banks of Detroit and Windsor, Ontario, then bends to flow largely south before emptying into Lake Erie. Communities to the south of the city can thus be accessed by traveling downriver (as opposed to upriver) along the waterway.

The Downriver label can be controversial, and many communities and the businesses therein have made various attempts to embrace, reject, or redefine the Downriver name.

History
The proximity to Canada across the Detroit River, coupled with residents associated with The Purple Gang, made Downriver one of the nation's major bootlegging hubs during Prohibition. According to Intemperance: The Lost War Against Liquor by Larry Englemann, "Soon after the passage of prohibition thousands of residents of the downriver communities began participating in rum-running and consequently reaped nearly unbelievable riches from their activities. During the prohibition years, in Ecorse and the other downriver towns, crime paid. Lavishly."

In the first half of the 20th century, the urban communities in the northern and middle parts of Downriver were mainly populated by workers who were employed by the dozens of auto factories, manufacturing suppliers, ship builders, steel mills and chemical plants making up local heavy industry, including the Ford Rouge Plant Complex, Great Lakes Steel, McLouth Steel, and BASF.

While heavy industry is still an important source of jobs, since the late 20th century and industrial restructuring, these communities have a higher proportion of white collar workers, as the economy of Metropolitan Detroit has diversified. Newer developments have featured larger single-family houses for contemporary tastes, and improved freeways have made commuting longer distances feasible.

Brownstown Township, Flat Rock, Gibraltar, Huron Township and Rockwood in the southern parts of Downriver were predominantly rural communities during the first half of the 20th century. While these communities have been developed for residential use and had significant population growth and suburbanization since the late 20th century, some working farms can still be found in these towns.

Today, Downriver overall is known largely as a suburban Detroit region with working-class residential neighborhoods and recreational opportunities focused on boating, fishing, bird watching and waterfowl hunting areas around the Detroit River. The Detroit River International Wildlife Refuge, and an extensive network of recreational trails built under the Downriver Linked Greenways Initiative, are two environmental conservation and recreation projects in the region.

The News-Herald is a local newspaper for Downriver, publishing on Wednesdays and Sundays.

Downriver communities

 Allen Park
 Brownstown Township
 Ecorse
 Flat Rock
 Gibraltar
 Grosse Ile Township
 Huron Charter Township
 New Boston
 Waltz
 Willow
 Lincoln Park
 Melvindale
 River Rouge
 Riverview
 Rockwood
 Romulus
 Southgate
 Taylor
 Trenton
 Woodhaven
 Wyandotte

Differences of communities
Downriver communities near Detroit and Dearborn (such as Allen Park, Lincoln Park, Wyandotte, River Rouge, Melvindale and Ecorse) were developed in the 1920s-1940s and are identified by brick and mortar homes (often bungalows), tree-lined streets and Works Progress Administration-designed municipal buildings, typical also of the homes within Detroit's city limits.

Communities that developed further south in the postwar period of the 1950s-1970s, such as Southgate, Taylor, Riverview, and Trenton, are more closely identified with tract homes and subdivisions. Through the 1980s, areas such as Huron Township, Flat Rock, Rockwood, and Woodhaven were undeveloped, and there are still some operating farms.

The Downriver cities of Ecorse, Gibraltar, River Rouge, Riverview, Trenton and Wyandotte, as well as Brownstown Township, are directly bordered by the Detroit River. Grosse Ile is an island community located in the middle of the Detroit River between mainland Downriver communities and the Canadian towns of LaSalle and Amherstburg, Ontario.

The Downriver communities collectively are considered to have a distinct cultural identity within suburban Detroit, although some individual Downriver communities share many similarities with towns in the western, northern and eastern suburbs of Detroit.

Taylor is the most populous city in the Downriver area. It is the site of the Wayne County Community College Downriver Campus, Michigan State Police Metro South Post, Southland Center, a sports complex called the Taylor Sportsplex, Oakwood Heritage Hospital, Taylor Meadows and Lakes of Taylor golf courses, Wallside Windows Factory, Cruisin' Telegraph, and Heritage Park. The latter is the site of the annual Junior League World Series each August.

In some cases, southern Dearborn  Heights is considered to be a part of the Downriver.

Representation in other media
Rock band Journey's 1981 arena-rock anthem "Don't Stop Believin'" describes a "city boy born and raised in South Detroit", which because little of the city of Detroit is at a latitude south of downtown, some have interpreted as a reference instead to Downriver. <ref>{{Cite web |last=Hyman |first=Peter |title=What Is the Great Mistake Lurking in 'Don't Stop Believin? |url=https://www.vulture.com/2012/01/journey-dont-stop-believin-south-detroit.html |access-date=2022-08-26 |website=Vulture |language=en-us}}</ref>

Parks and recreation 
Cruisin' Downriver
Cruisin' Downriver is an annual car show and cruise that takes place on M-85/Fort St. in the Downriver cities of Southgate, Riverview, Wyandotte and Lincoln Park. It has run yearly since 2000, with people bringing their vintage cars to be seen and heard. There are also places to eat, drink, and shop along the route.

Population
According to an analysis of 2020 census data by the Southeast Michigan Council of Governments, the 18 Downriver cities and townships had an aggregate population of 356,601. 

As of 1989, the most common ethnic identities were German, Irish, and Polish. Other ethnic groups included Southern Whites, Blacks, Italians, Maltese and Hungarians. Ethnic festivals have been held during the summers. As of that year, historically most people growing up in Downriver stayed there after entering adulthood. Since the late 20th century, there has been an increase in immigrants of other ancestries and religions, including East Asian Muslims and Hindus.

Downriver communities were once known for their numerous residents of Southern origin, who had migrated to Michigan to work in the automotive industry during the early to mid-20th century. This migration slowed after World War II. Distinctively or predominantly Southern neighborhoods have not existed in Downriver for several decades.

The composition of the workforce in Downriver communities is diverse as residents work in both white-collar and blue-collar occupations. One of the largest employers is the Ford Motor Company, which has a large industrial complex in nearby Dearborn and numerous other area plants. In addition, residents work in professional jobs in downtown Detroit.

Downriver is also home to Detroit Metropolitan Wayne County Airport, in Romulus.

Notable residents or natives
 Steve Avery (Trenton/Taylor/Dearborn), professional baseball player
 Lucille Ball (Wyandotte), actress
 Joe C. (Taylor), Kid Rock sidekick
 Lloyd Carr (Riverview), former University of Michigan head football coach
 Archie Clark (Ecorse), former NBA basketball player
 Dann Florek (Flat Rock), actor
 Max Gail (Grosse Ile), actor
 Bob Guiney (Riverview), appeared on The Bachelor
 William S. Knudsen (Grosse Ile), automotive industry executive and U.S. Army General
 Charley Lau (Romulus), former MLB hitting coach (d. 1984)
 John Long (Romulus), Former professional basketball player Detroit Pistons
 Budd Lynch (Wyandotte), Public address announcer of The Detroit Red Wings
 Eric Lynch (Woodhaven), former NFL fullback
 Terry Mills (Romulus), Former professional basketball player for the Detroit Pistons
 Lee Majors (Wyandotte), actor
 Bill Morrison (Lincoln Park), co-creator of Bongo Comics
 Kevin Nash (Trenton), pro Wrestler and actor
 Ransom E. Olds (Grosse Ile), automotive industry pioneer
 Heinz Prechter (Grosse Ile), automotive industry businessman
 Mary Lynn Rajskub (Trenton), actress
 Brian Rafalski (Wyandotte), former NHL hockey player
 J. J. Putz (Trenton), relief pitcher for the Arizona Diamondbacks
 Bob Seger (Lincoln Park), rock musician
 Matt Shoemaker (Wyandotte), professional baseball player
 Chester Taylor (River Rouge), former NFL Running Back for the Chicago Bears,  the Minnesota Vikings, and the Baltimore Ravens
 Robert Teet (River Rouge/Riverview), U.S. Wrestling team member, All World honors; author
 Rob Tyner (Lincoln Park), MC5 vocalist
 Cameron Waterman (Grosse Ile), inventor of the outboard motor
 John Varvatos (Allen Park), fashion designer
 Jennifer Valoppi (Allen Park), Newscaster
 Vickie Winans (Ecorse), Gospel Singer
 Derek St. Holmes (Riverview), Guitarist for Ted Nugent and vocalist on recorded version of "Stranglehold"
 Tom Tresh  (Allen Park), MLB Rookie of the Year, 1962; Played for NY Yankees & Detroit Tigers
 Paul Assenmacher  (Allen Park), Major League Pitcher in the 1980s and 1990s
 Andy Greene (Trenton), NHL Hockey Player for the New Jersey Devils
 Bob Kuzava (Wyandotte/Grosse Ile), professional baseball player, New York Yankees pitcher

Notes

References

Bibliography
 Hill, Richard Child and Michael Indergaard. "Deindustrialization in Southwest Detroit." In: Cummings, Scott (editor). Business Elites and Urban Development: Case Studies and Critical Perspectives (SUNY series on urban public policy''). SUNY Press, 1988. Start page 235. , 9780887065774.

External links

Geography of Detroit
Metro Detroit
Geography of Wayne County, Michigan
Michigan populated places on the Detroit River